Richard Bennett Hatfield  (April 9, 1931 – April 26, 1991) was a New Brunswick politician and the longest serving premier of New Brunswick from 1970 to 1987.

Early life 
The youngest of five children of Heber Hatfield and Dora Robinson, Richard was brought up with politics in the household.  His father, already a well known potato shipper, was Hartland's mayor when he was born. In 1938, at 7 years old, his father brought him to the Conservative Party of Canada leadership convention in Winnipeg where he met his namesake, R. B. Bennett.  In 1940 Heber was elected Victoria-Carleton county Conservative Member of Parliament and served until his death due to cancer in 1952.  Young Richard spent a lot of time in Ottawa even getting to know John Diefenbaker and his first wife Edna.

After graduating from high school in 1948 in his home town Hartland, Hatfield attended Acadia University for four years majoring in chemistry and English where he became a member of the Sigma Chi Fraternity. He also got involved in drama, an experience that seemed to have the most lasting impact of any during his years at Acadia.  "That was extremely valuable" he said. "It would benefit every politician to have a bit of theatre training... too many politicians get caught up using big words to impress, but don't know how to project feelings."  After Acadia, he attended Dalhousie University to become a doctor but after a year he turned to law. He graduated Dalhousie Law School in 1956.

Early career 

Hatfield left Halifax in 1957 and moved to Truro to take a job with the firm Patterson, Smith, Matthew and Grant so he could do his six months articling period. After successfully completing his articles, he left Truro to join Gordon Churchill who was at the time Minister of Industry in Ottawa. He declined a job offer at the firm and he never practised law again. He stayed in Ottawa for nine months until he called his brother Fred for a job back home. Frederick Heber Hatfield (1922-2004), who was managing the potato shipping and processing operation since Heber died, agreed and Richard became vice-president of sales. He worked with his brother until 1965. When his family sold their potato chip plant to Humpty Dumpty Snack Foods, he decided to be a politician full-time.

Political career 
In 1961, Hugh John Flemming left his Carleton County seat and ran successfully in the federal seat of Royal. Fred, then president of Carleton County PC Association, offered the nomination to Richard, who accepted. He ran against his brother-in-law Gerald Clark, and won easily with a majority of 1,736 votes. Years later, he recalled that his father's reputation "had helped me to be elected, and now I was on my own."

When the New Brunswick Legislature was not sitting, Hatfield sold potato chips all over the Maritimes. His first few years as an MLA were uneventful, but he spent a lot of time talking to reporters about politics in Fredericton and Montreal.

He became Leader of the Opposition and interim leader of the Progressive Conservatives after the 1967 general election and was elected party leader in 1969. He led the party to victory in the 1970 provincial election. During Hatfield's long tenure, he became prominent on the national stage by allying with Canadian Prime Minister Pierre Trudeau during the constitutional negotiations that led to the 1982 patriation of the Canadian constitution and the creation of the Canadian Charter of Rights and Freedoms. He also took leadership in helping create equality between the province's francophone Acadian minority anglophone majority.

His attempts at attracting investment to the province and developing the economy were less successful. In the 1970s, the Hatfield government financed the manufacture of the Bricklin SV-1 in hope of creating an auto industry in the province. Although the visionary project produced an advanced sports car, huge cost overruns and poor management led to the company's demise.

Controversies and resignation
Hatfield's last years in office were plagued by personal scandal. On September 25, 1984, the RCMP found 35 grams of marijuana in his suitcase during a security check of luggage conducted before a flight from Fredericton to Moncton during a royal visit by Queen Elizabeth II. He was charged with criminal possession of marijuana on October 26. The trial was postponed when Judge James D. Harper appeared on a radio show and suggested that privileged people should receive stiffer sentences than "Joe Blow from Kokomo who is the town drunk." On January 29, 1985, Hatfield was acquitted by Judge Andrew Harrigan after a two-day trial. Harrigan sparked legal furor after he suggested that a journalist might have planted the drugs to create "the juiciest story ever to crack the media."

Several days after the acquittal, allegations emerged that Hatfield had invited four young men to an all-night party in his Fredericton home in 1981. The men accused Hatfield of giving them marijuana and of using cocaine during the evening. They also alleged that Hatfield flew them to Montreal aboard a government aircraft and put them up in a downtown hotel for the night. Hatfield denied the allegations and stated, "It is true that they were in my home together with others, some four years ago. However, they were strangers to me. Those who know me will confirm I am extremely gregarious. I meet and talk to people on the street, in the markets and the shops, in the restaurants and bars. I invite them to my house, I go to their houses. The door to my house is usually unlocked and frequently open. That is my way. I admit I am unconventional." No legal action was taken.

In the 1987 election, Hatfield's PC Party lost every seat in the legislature, a wipeout that had not been not seen in Canada in over half a century. Hatfield was soundly defeated in his own riding by the Liberal, Allison DeLong, and lost by 18 points. Hatfield resigned as Premier of New Brunswick and as party leader.

Later years and death 
In 1990, he was appointed to the Senate of Canada by Governor General Ray Hnatyshyn, on the advice of Brian Mulroney.  Soon after taking up his appointment, he was stricken with an inoperable brain tumour and died in 1991, at the age of 60. His memorial service, which was held at the Christ Church Cathedral in Fredericton, New Brunswick, was attended by Premiers and Prime Ministers, friends and opponents.

Personal life 
It was a widely known open secret that Hatfield was gay; in the 1978 provincial election, New Brunswick Liberal Party leader Joseph Daigle attracted criticism for a campaign speech in which he referred to Hatfield as a "faded pansy". Janet Cawley of the Chicago Tribune called him, "a flamboyant, eccentric and controversial figure with a penchant for modern art, rock and roll, and New York night life". His critics nicknamed him "Disco Dick". Despite this, he never officially came out as such during his lifetime, and his sexual orientation only began to be discussed on the record in media and biographical sources after his death. Hatfield said of his bachelor lifestyle, "the nuclear family—one wife, two kids and one dog—looks nice on Christmas cards, but they pay an awful price".

References

External links 
Government of New Brunswick biography (pdf)
 

1931 births
1991 deaths
Acadia University alumni
Canadian LGBT people in provincial and territorial legislatures
Canadian Protestants
Canadian senators from New Brunswick
Schulich School of Law alumni
Deaths from brain cancer in Canada
Gay politicians
Lawyers in New Brunswick
LGBT governors and heads of sub-national entities
LGBT Protestants
Members of the Order of New Brunswick
Members of the King's Privy Council for Canada
Leaders of the Progressive Conservative Party of New Brunswick
People from Woodstock, New Brunswick
Premiers of New Brunswick
Progressive Conservative Party of Canada senators
Progressive Conservative Party of New Brunswick MLAs
20th-century Canadian LGBT people
Canadian gay men